Ruth Domgörgen (born 11 July 1962 in Bonn) is a West German sprint canoer who competed in the late 1980s. She finished fifth in the K-4 500 m event at the 1988 Summer Olympics in Seoul.

References
Sports-reference.com profile

1962 births
Sportspeople from Bonn
Canoeists at the 1988 Summer Olympics
West German female canoeists
Living people
Olympic canoeists of West Germany